Linley may refer to

Places
 Linley, Barrow, Shropshire, England, the location of St Leonard's Church, Linley
 Linley, More, Shropshire, United Kingdom, near Bishop's Castle
 Linley Point, New South Wales, Australia
Linley House, a house located in the suburb
 Linley Sambourne House, United Kingdom

Surname
 Cody Linley (born 1989), American actor and singer
 Elizabeth Ann Linley (1754–1792), British actress and singer
 Eversley Linley (born 1969), Saint Vincent and the Grenadines sprinter 
 George Linley (1798–1865), British songwriter
 Harry Linley (fl. 1913–1921), British footballer
 Jessica Linley (born 1989), British beauty pageant winner
 Maria Linley (1763–1784), British singer
 Mary Linley (1758–1787), British singer
 Ozias Thurston Linley (1765–1831), British clergy
 Samuel Linley (1760–1778), British musician
 Ted Linley (footballer) (1894-unknown), British footballer
 Thomas Linley the elder (1733–1795), British composer
 Thomas Linley the younger (1756–1778), British composer
 Tim Linley (born 1982), British cricketer
 William Linley (1771–1835), British composer

Title
 David Armstrong-Jones, Viscount Linley (born 1961), British aristocrat & furniture maker
 Serena Armstrong-Jones, Viscountess Linley (born 1970), British aristocrat

See also
 Lindley (disambiguation)